Ishiuchi Dam  is a gravity dam located in Kumamoto Prefecture in Japan. The dam is used for flood control and water supply. The catchment area of the dam is 3.9 km2. The dam impounds about 12  ha of land when full and can store 1200 thousand cubic meters of water. The construction of the dam was started on 1979 and completed in 1992.

See also
List of dams in Japan

References

Dams in Kumamoto Prefecture